Action U.S.A. (released in the Philippines as Above the Law) is a 1989 American action film directed by Hollywood stuntman John Stewart who was also known for his works on the 1973 film Scorpio and the TV series Mighty Morphin Power Rangers.

Plot
A woman is protected by two FBI agents after the murder of her boyfriend by gangsters wanting his stolen diamonds, then pursuing her to not talk about it.

Cast
Gregory Scott Cummins
Cameron Mitchell
William Hubbard Knight
Ross Hagen
Barri Murphy

Release
Action U.S.A. was first released as Above the Law in the Philippines on March 25, 1989.

Critical response
Variety called the rediscovered film as "an excellent example of the type of escapist fun that packed drive-in theaters as recently as a decade ago but is now without a natural home."

Availability
It had been available on VHS by First Look Home Entertainment
before being released on Blu-Ray November 2020 by Vinegar Syndrome. It was also made available on demand by Alamo Drafthouse.

See also
1989 in film
B movie
Stuntpeople

External links
Action U.S.A. on IMDB
Action U.S.A. on AllMovie
Trailer

References

1989 films
American action films
1980s English-language films
Rediscovered American films
1989 action films
1980s rediscovered films
1989 independent films
1980s American films